Richard Bangwe (born 25 September 1979) is a Botswana former footballer who played as a midfielder. He played one match for the Botswana national football team in 2003.

See also
Football in Botswana

References

External links

Association football midfielders
Botswana footballers
Botswana international footballers
1979 births
Living people